The Thai Ambassador in Moscow is the official representative of the Government in Bangkok to the Government of Russia.

List of representatives

 Russia–Thailand relations
List of ambassadors of Russia to Thailand

References 

 
Russia
Thailand